"I'm in You" is the hit song released by Peter Frampton as a single from his album I'm in You, released in 1977. It rose to No. 2 on the US Billboard Hot 100 and No. 1 on the Cash Box Top 100 and in Canada, becoming his most successful single. The song was kept from reaching the top spot on Billboard by Andy Gibb's "I Just Want to Be Your Everything".

Writing and recording
"I'm in You" was written by Peter Frampton after returning to New York City from touring to record his live album Frampton Comes Alive! in 1976.

The song is about Frampton being recently separated from his first wife, the model Mary Lovett.

The song was recorded at Electric Lady Studios in Manhattan's Greenwich Village. Frampton demanded that bodyguards keep overzealous fans from disturbing his recording sessions.

This song is mostly a keyboard-driven number, featuring background vocals from Mick Jagger, with the sound of a Baldwin Piano, Moog synthesizer, ARP String Synthesizer, Gibson Les Paul, acoustic guitar, bass guitar, drums, percussion and vocals. It is therefore omitted from the set list of his live performances of "Frampton's Guitar Circus", in spite of being his biggest hit.

Billboard described it as a "grandly contemporary rock ballad with a deep but touching lyric."  Cash Box said that "it is Peter's voice in front of a string-led wall of sound, with occasional piano and guitar emphasis, that give the single a soaring quality." Record World said that it "relies on a quiet intensity to deliver its message, and its impact increases with each listening."

Frampton recorded the song again as version for acoustic guitar for his 2016 CD Acoustic Classic

Personnel
 Peter Frampton – electric guitar, acoustic guitar, piano, ARP String Synthesizer, vocals
 Bob Mayo – Moog synthesizer, background vocals
 Stanley Sheldon – bass guitar
 John Siomos – drums, percussion
 Mick Jagger – background vocals

Chart performance

Weekly charts

Year-end charts

Certifications

See also
 "I Have Been in You"
 List of Cash Box Top 100 number-one singles of 1977

References

1977 singles
Peter Frampton songs
Songs written by Peter Frampton
Song recordings produced by Chris Kimsey
Song recordings produced by Peter Frampton
Cashbox number-one singles
RPM Top Singles number-one singles
1976 songs
A&M Records singles